Coleophora chalcogrammella is a moth of the family Coleophoridae. It was first described by Philipp Christoph Zeller in 1839 and is found in Europe.

Description
The wingspan is 

The larvae feed on thyme-leaf sandwort (Arenaria serpyllifolia), field mouse-ear, (Cerastium arvense), three-nerved sandwort (Moehringia trinervia), lesser stitchwort (Stellaria graminea) and greater stitchwort (Stellaria holostea). In autumn, the larvae make a short corridor, which widens into a small blotch, out of which the first case is cut. After hibernation, the final case is made. The mouth angle is about 30°. Full-grown cases can be found in May.

Pupa: The pupae of moths have visible head appendages, wings and legs which lie in sheaths.

Distribution
It is found from Sweden and northern Russia to the Pyrenees and the Alps and from Great Britain to Romania.

References

External links

 Lepiforum.de

chalcogrammella
Moths described in 1839
Moths of Europe
Taxa named by Philipp Christoph Zeller